Bajan is a surname. It may refer to:

 Artúr Baján (1888–1969), Hungarian rower
 Cristian Bajan (born 1967), Australian handball player
 Jerzy Bajan (1901–1967), Polish aviator
 Marek Bajan (born 1956), Polish pentathlete
 Robert Băjan (born 1995), Romanian footballer

See also